Epichloë schardlii is a hybrid asexual species in the fungal genus Epichloë. 

A systemic and seed-transmissible grass symbiont first described in 2017,  Epichloë schardlii is a natural allopolyploid of two strains in the Epichloë typhina complex (subsp. poae × subsp. poae).

Epichloë schardlii is found in North America, where it has been identified in the grass species Poa alsodes.

References

schardlii
Fungi described in 2017
Fungi of North America